Dominika Koleničková (born 24 September 1992) is a Slovak footballer who plays as a midfielder for 2. Frauen-Bundesliga club FC Saarbrücken and the Slovakia women's national team.

References

1992 births
Living people
Women's association football midfielders
Slovak women's footballers
Slovakia women's international footballers
FK Union Nové Zámky players
ŠK Slovan Bratislava (women) players
1. FC Saarbrücken (women) players
Expatriate women's footballers in Germany
Slovak expatriate sportspeople in Germany
2. Frauen-Bundesliga players